Kiyomi Niwata (born 10 December 1970 in Ushiku, Ibaraki Prefecture) is a professional triathlete from Japan, triple Olympian (Sydney, Athens, Beijing), multiple-time National Champion (2004, 2005, 2006), and an Asian Aquathlon Champion and Oceanian Triathlon Champion of the year 2009.

Kiyomi Niwata and Anja Dittmer are the only triathletes who took part in all three Olympic triathlons. In Sydney and in Athens, Niwata placed 14th, in Beijing, 9th.
She is coached by Col Stewart.

ITU Competitions  
In the 14 years from 1997 to 2010, Kiyomi Niwata took part in 99 ITU competitions and achieved 39 top ten positions.
In 2010, as a veteran at the age of 39 years, she still belongs to the world elite, takes part in the Dextro Energy World Championship Series together with Ai Ueda, and she won, for instance, the gold medal at the World Cup in Ishigaki.
The following list is based upon the official ITU Profile Page. Unless indicated otherwise, all competitions are triathlons (Olympic Distance) and belong to the Elite category.

BG = the sponsor British Gas · DNF = did not finish · DNS = did not start

External links 
 Niwata's Webpage in Japanese

Notes 

1970 births
Living people
Japanese female triathletes
Olympic triathletes of Japan
Triathletes at the 2000 Summer Olympics
Triathletes at the 2004 Summer Olympics
Triathletes at the 2008 Summer Olympics